Wang Ziyi (born July 13, 1996), also known as BOOGIE, is a Chinese rapper, dancer and singer. He is a member of C-pop boy group BBT and former member of Chinese boy group Nine Percent. 
He is known for his participation as a trainee under Simply Joy Music in the idol survival show Idol Producer, where he finished in 7th place overall and thus became a member of Nine Percent. The group achieved huge success in China and was scheduled to promote for 18 months. 
After the group officially disbanded on October 6, 2019 and held their final farewell concert on October 12, 2019 in Guangzhou, Wang continued on his career as a solo artist.

Career

2017: Before joining Idol Producer
Wang debuted as part of boy band BBT on June 17, 2017, prior to participating in Idol Producer. He is still a member of BBT as of recent times, although being mainly active as a solo artist nowadays.

2018-2019: Debut with Nine Percent and disbandment
Wang, along with members of BBT and other trainees from Simply Joy Music, represented the company in iQiyi's new Chinese survival reality show, Idol Producer. Trainees who were in the Top 9 in the final episode would debut as part of temporary Chinese boy group Nine Percent. The group was set to promote for 18 months before disbanding. Wang eventually placed 7th in its final episode and thus debuted as a member of Nine Percent.

After debuting with Nine Percent, Wang took part in Chinese dance competition show Shake It Up along with other celebrities. 

Nine Percent released two studio albums, "To the Nines" and "More Than Forever (限定的记忆)", before disbanding on October 6, 2019.
On October 12, 2019, Nine Percent held their final farewell concert in Guangzhou, China.

2018-present: Debut as solo artist
On July 13, 2018, Wang made his debut as a solo artist under his stage name BOOGIE, releasing his first single, "AMH", which placed 11th in the Billboard charts in China.
Wang then released his second single titled, "6AM" on December 19, 2018.

On May 31, 2021, Wang was revealed to have lost his a lawsuit against his label, Simply Joy Music. The lawsuit was filed on grounds that his label had defaulted on various contractual terms. However, his contract termination attempt was ruled as invalid by the Beijing Chaoyang District Court. 

Wang has since revealed his intention appeal against the decision in a separate court.

Filmography

Television series

Television shows

Discography

Singles

Awards and nominations

Notes

References

1996 births
Living people
Idol Producer contestants
Nine Percent members
21st-century Chinese male actors
21st-century Chinese male singers
Chinese male television actors
Chinese male dancers
Chinese male rappers
Chinese pop singers
Singers from Shanxi
Chinese male singer-songwriters